The UK Rock & Metal Albums Chart is a record chart which ranks the best-selling rock and heavy metal albums in the United Kingdom. Compiled and published by the Official Charts Company, the data is based on each album's weekly physical sales, digital downloads and streams. In 2014, there were 39 albums that topped the 52 published charts. The first number-one album of the year was the 2009 Foo Fighters compilation Greatest Hits. The first new number-one album of the year was Dark Days, the third and final album by English alternative rock band Canterbury. The final number-one album of the year was Pink Floyd's fifteenth and final studio album The Endless River, which first topped the chart for three weeks in November before returning for a two-week spell at the end of December.

The most successful album on the UK Rock & Metal Albums Chart in 2014 was The Endless River, which spent five weeks at number one and was the best-selling rock and metal album of the year, ranking ninth in the UK End of Year Albums Chart. Cavalier Youth by You Me at Six spent four separate weeks at number one during early 2014, ranking as the 98th best-selling album in the UK for the year. The second album by Slash featuring Myles Kennedy and The Conspirators, World on Fire was number one for three weeks, while four albums – Queens of the Stone Age's sixth studio album ...Like Clockwork, Black Stone Cherry's fourth studio album Magic Mountain, Linkin Park's sixth studio album The Hunting Party and Slipknot's fifth studio album .5: The Gray Chapter – spent two weeks at number one in 2014.

Chart history

See also
2014 in British music
List of UK Rock & Metal Singles Chart number ones of 2014

References

External links
Official UK Rock & Metal Albums Chart Top 40 at the Official Charts Company
The Official UK Top 40 Rock Albums at BBC Radio 1

2014 in British music
United Kingdom Rock and Metal Albums
2014